Murkongselek is a village in Assam. It is located in the north-eastern part of Dhemaji district, 42 km from Pasighat in Arunachal Pradesh. Tourist attractions are located nearby in Mohmora, Jonai and Silapathar. The village also has a railway station. It is around 540 km from Guwahati. Nearest airport is Mohanbari Airport, Dibrugarh.

See also
 Murkongselek railway station

References
from india 9

Villages in Dhemaji district